The Praise the Dragon Flag is a semi-official national anthem of China, as well as a military and an imperial anthem. It shares the same tune with Tune of Li Zhongtang, the semi-official anthem of the Qing Dynasty from 1896 to 1906.

History
In 1906, (the 32nd year of Guangxu), the Department of the Army of the Qing Dynasty was established, and wrote this song as an anthem, Qing Dynasty used this song as temporary national anthem (代國歌).

Lyrics

Simplified Chinese
于斯万年，亚东大帝国！
山岳纵横独立帜，江河漫延文明波；
四百兆¹民神明冑，地大物产博。
扬我黄龙帝国徽，唱我帝国歌！

Traditional Chinese
於斯萬年，亞東大帝國！
山嶽縱橫獨立幟，江河漫延文明波；
四百兆¹民神明冑，地大物產博。
揚我黃龍帝國徽，唱我帝國歌！

Hanyu Pinyin
yú sī wàn nián, yà dōng dà dì guó! 
shān yuè zòng héng dú lì zhì, jiāng hé màn yán wén míng bō;
sì bǎi zhào mín shén míng zhòu, dì dà wù chǎn bó.
yáng wǒ huáng lóng dì guó huī, chàng wǒ dì guó gē!

English Translation
We located here for thousands years as a great empire in east Asia! 
Mountains in our land, rivers in our land, spread the culture;
Four hundred million people blessed by God, we have a big land and plenty of product.
Raise our Yellow Dragon Emblem Proud, sing our empire's song!

Notes

See also 
Historical Chinese anthems
Royal anthem

External links 
 Praise the Dragon Flag on Youtube (Instrumental)
 Praise the Dragon Flag on Youtube (Vocal)

Political party songs
Royal anthems
National anthems
National symbols of China
Chinese patriotic songs
Asian anthems

zh:中国国歌